Select Hits is a cover band. They hit #79 on the UK Singles Chart with a pre-release cover version of "Sonnentanz (Sun Don't Shine)" and a UK #71 hit with a pre-release cover version of "Talk Dirty".

Discography

References

Cover bands
Musical groups established in 2013
2013 establishments in the United Kingdom